Ibrahim Mohammed Ghaleb Jahshan (Arabic:  إبراهيم محمد غالب جحشان; born 28 September 1990) is a Saudi Arabian footballer.

Club career
Ghaleb joined the Al-Nassr U-17 team in the summer of 2006. As he was under the scouts' eyes, Al-Nassr U-17 team manager, Nasir AlKanani, succeeded in including Ghaleb in his talent U-17 squad. Not surprisingly, with his accurate passes and mature look in the first year, Ghaleb did not take a long time to get promoted to the first team. His first appearance was in the middle of the 2008/2009 season when the Argentine Edgardo Bauza picked him for the line-up in a match against arch-rival Al-Hilal. These kinds of games were considered to be tough for a young 17-year-old player. However, Ghaleb surprised spectators with his talent by keeping control of the ball and making accurate passes. Since then, he has assured his position in the squad.

On 8 March 2010, Ghaleb signed with a couple of other young talented players, the first professional contract in his career with Al-Nassr ending in 2015.

International career
He made his debut for Saudi Arabia national team on 14 October 2010. He participated in the middle of the second half in an international friendly against Tunisia.

Career statistics

Club

Honours

Club
Al-Nassr
Saudi Professional League: 2013–14, 2014–15, 2018–19
Saudi Crown Prince Cup: 2013–14

Individual
 Saudi Professional League Youth Player of the season 2009–10.

References

Living people
Saudi Arabian footballers
1990 births
People from Eastern Province, Saudi Arabia
Al Nassr FC players
Al-Faisaly FC players
Saudi Professional League players
Association football midfielders
2015 AFC Asian Cup players
2019 AFC Asian Cup players
Saudi Arabia international footballers